Ronarc'h Peninsula (Presqu'île Ronarc'h) is a peninsula in the south-east of the principal island of Kerguelen, a subantarctic island currently occupied by France in the southern Indian Ocean. It is connected by a narrow strip of land to another peninsula, namely the Presqu'île Jeanne d'Arc to the southwest, which is approximately twice its area.

The Ronarch Peninsula forms the southern limit of the Golfe du Morbihan (Kerguelen). It corresponds to the Courbet Peninsula and Prince de Galles Peninsula which form the northern limit of the gulf. The Ronarch Peninsula and the Prince de Galles Peninsula are separated by a narrows called the Royal Passage.

Landforms of the Kerguelen Islands
Ronarc'h
Peninsulas of France